Clough H. Rice House is a historic home located at Hendersonville, Henderson County, North Carolina. It was built about 1875, and is a two-story, single-pile, frame I-house, with Italianate style design elements.  It has a two-story, gable-roofed rear ell.  It is sheathed in weatherboard and sits on a rubble masonry foundation.

It was listed on the National Register of Historic Places in 2011.

References

Houses on the National Register of Historic Places in North Carolina
Italianate architecture in North Carolina
Houses completed in 1875
Houses in Henderson County, North Carolina
National Register of Historic Places in Henderson County, North Carolina
Hendersonville, North Carolina